Maria Celina Rucci (born in Buenos Aires, October 9, 1976) is an Argentine vedette, actress and model. She was a Playboy Playmate and the winner of Bailando por un Sueño 2007. Rucci was married to Claudio Minnicelli; she has a son and two adopted daughters. His next job will be to lead the program of Moria Casan, where he is currently a panelist, after sawing the post

Radio 
Plumas y Lentejuelas (2006) "La Fonola" LRA Radio Nacional (AM 870)

References

External links

1977 births
Argentine vedettes
Actresses from Buenos Aires
Living people